Lys-lez-Lannoy (literally Lys near Lannoy; West Flemish: Lis by Lannoy) is a commune in the Nord department in northern France. It is part of the Métropole Européenne de Lille.

Population

Heraldry

See also
Communes of the Nord department

References

Lyslezlannoy
French Flanders